The men's 50 metre freestyle competition at the 1995 Pan Pacific Swimming Championships took place on August 13 at the Georgia Tech Aquatic Center.  The last champion was Jon Olsen of US.

This race consisted of one length of the pool in freestyle.

Records
Prior to this competition, the existing world and Pan Pacific records were as follows:

Results
All times are in minutes and seconds.

Heats
The first round was held on August 13.

B Final 
The B final was held on August 13.

A Final 
The A final was held on August 13.

References

1995 Pan Pacific Swimming Championships